Sunny Ekeh Kingsley (born 9 September 1981) is a Nigerian retired professional footballer who played as a forward.

Club career

Born in Owerri, Kingsley moved to Portugal in 1998 still as a junior, finishing his grooming at U.D. Leiria. He made his senior debuts with amateurs U.F.C.I. Tomar, switching after one year to Caldas Sport Clube in the third division.

After stellar performances, Kingsley moved straight to the Primeira Liga in the 2003 summer, signing with S.C. Beira-Mar. He made his debut in the competition on 17 August in a 0–1 away loss against C.S. Marítimo (21 minutes played), and finished his first season with 33 games – 29 starts – and four goals, helping the Aveiro club to the 11th position.

Kingsley joined AEK Larnaca F.C. in the Cypriot First Division in January 2007, following an unassuming spell in Egypt with Zamalek SC. He scored four times in only ten appearances in his debut campaign, and also helped his team reach the semi-finals of the Cypriot Cup. In July 2008 he moved sides and countries again, signing for Ukrainian Premier League's FC Metalurh Donetsk for €620,000.

In July 2010, Kingsley returned to his previous club. He played the last match of his career on 29 January 2012, netting once in the 6–0 win over Nea Salamis Famagusta FC for the league championship; he retired subsequently at the age of only 30, and accepted an offer to become his last team's chief scout.

Kingsley came out of retirement in the 2014 summer after two years of inactivity, signing with Nikos & Sokratis Erimis also in Cyprus.

External links

Official website 

1981 births
Living people
People from Owerri
Nigerian footballers
Association football forwards
First Bank F.C. players
Primeira Liga players
Segunda Divisão players
U.F.C.I. Tomar players
Caldas S.C. players
S.C. Beira-Mar players
Zamalek SC players
Cypriot First Division players
Cypriot Second Division players
AEK Larnaca FC players
Nikos & Sokratis Erimis FC players
Ukrainian Premier League players
FC Metalurh Donetsk players
Nigerian expatriate footballers
Expatriate footballers in Portugal
Expatriate footballers in Egypt
Expatriate footballers in Cyprus
Expatriate footballers in Ukraine
Nigerian expatriate sportspeople in Portugal
Nigerian expatriate sportspeople in Cyprus
Nigerian expatriate sportspeople in Ukraine
Egyptian Premier League players
Sportspeople from Imo State